The Fan is a 1981 American psychological horror-thriller film directed by Edward Bianchi and starring Lauren Bacall, Michael Biehn, James Garner, and Maureen Stapleton. The plot follows a famous stage and film actress named Sally Ross (Bacall) who is stalked by a violent, deranged fan (Biehn), who begins killing those around her. The screenplay by Priscilla Chapman and John Hartwell was based on the 1977 novel of the same name by Bob Randall.

Development of The Fan began in 1979, and several iterations of the screenplay were produced by a number of writers before Chapman and Hartwell's version was finalized. Filmways initially offered to co-produce and distribute the film, offering to pay for the majority of its production budget. However, after its completion in 1980, Filmways backed out of the project due to their studio's experiencing financial troubles, after which Paramount Pictures acquired distribution rights.

The Fan was released in the United States on May 15, 1981, and was a box-office bomb, grossing $3.1 million. It received largely unfavorable reviews from film critics, though it would later acquire a cult following in the years after its release. Though Bacall was publicly critical of the film after its release, she later reflected that she felt her performance in it was among her best work.

Plot
Douglas Breen, a deranged young New York City record store clerk, writes a rambling letter to stage and film star Sally Ross, reading: "Dear Miss Ross, I am your greatest fan, because unlike the others, I want nothing from you. The only thing that matters to me is your happiness."

Sally's secretary, Belle Goldman, has been intercepting Douglas's numerous disturbed letters, responding herself and asking him to stop. Douglas feels ignored, and becomes determined to meet with Sally and consummate his "love" for her. Sally, meanwhile, is rehearsing for a major stage musical while also reconnecting with her ex-husband and fellow actor Jake Berman. After Belle receives another explicit letter from Douglas, she brings it to Sally's attention; Sally scolds her for being rude to her fans, and brushes it off, reasoning that she has dealt with similar types of fans before.

After Douglas is fired from his record store job, he begins stalking Sally, sitting outside of her apartment building and following her to rehearsals. He decides to hand-deliver a letter to her while she is rehearsing for the musical, but watches the man at the studio give the letter to Belle, whom he realizes has been responding to his letters. Douglas follows Belle into the subway, and slashes her face with a razor. She survives the attack, but is hospitalized. When police press her for information, Belle cannot recall the return addresses written on the obsessive letters to Sally, and Sally informs them that she does not keep the fan mail she receives.

Increasingly enraged by his lack of contact with Sally, Douglas breaks into her apartment and murders her maid, Elsa, in the bathroom, then trashes the apartment in a fit of rage. When Sally returns home accompanied by a private investigator and discovers what has happened, she also finds a threatening letter left behind by Douglas, which reads: "Dearest bitch, see how accessible you are? How would you like to be fucked with a meat cleaver?"

Sally, distraught, flees New York and retreats to a secluded house in the country, where she is visited by Jake. Meanwhile, at a bar, Douglas meets a man who cruises him for sex. The two go to the roof of Douglas's apartment, where the man begins to perform oral sex on him, but Douglas murders the man and sets his body on fire, leaving a fake suicide letter nearby to confuse the police.

The opening night of the musical arrives, and Sally, having received word of Douglas's supposed suicide, returns to the city to perform. Douglas sits in the audience, watching her. After the show, Sally sits in her dressing room with the costume designer, Hilda. Douglas kills both Hilda and a nightwatchman while Sally removes her makeup. He confronts Sally in her dressing room, covered in blood, and chases her through the now-empty theatre. She tries to fend him off with a riding crop, but he overpowers her and beats her with the crop while denigrating her for ignoring him. When he tries to kiss her, Sally angrily rebukes Douglas for being a psychopath and a murderer; his rage subsides and he breaks down in tears, begging for Sally to love him, but she uses the lapse in his guard to stab him in the neck with his own knife, killing him. Sally exits the theatre, leaving Douglas's dead body in one of the seats, as a voiceover of his first letter to Sally is heard:
 
Dear Miss Ross, I have finally worked up enough courage to write you. You do not know me, but who I am does not matter. If there is such a thing as a soul, which is the basis of all life, then you are my soul and your life is my life. This is the first letter of what I hope will be an everlasting correspondence. Your greatest fan, Douglas Breen.

Cast

Production

Development
The original screenplay for The Fan was adapted for the screen Norman Wexler from Bob Randall's 1977 epistolary thriller novel of the same name. Filmways was initially attached to the project as its co-producer and distributor, and offered to supply $7 million of its proposed $9 million budget.

In 1979, director Waris Hussein was attached to the project as director, and filming was tentatively scheduled to begin in September of that year, though it was soon postponed until February 1980. The film subsequently underwent several rewrites: In February 1980, it was reported that Diana Hammond had been hired to rework the screenplay; however, screenwriters Priscilla Chapman and John Hartwell undertook further rewrites and are the film's only writers to receive credit. Hussein subsequently left the project over creative differences, after which Edward Bianchi overtook the role of director.

Casting
Producer Robert Stigwood initially considered Shirley MacLaine and Anne Bancroft for the lead before Lauren Bacall agreed to take the part.

Filming
The Fan was shot in New York City from April 1 to June 1980.

Release
Filmways, the studio that originally agreed to distribute and co-produce the film, experienced a "financial crisis" resulting in an inability to compensate for the film's production budget. The film was then acquired by Paramount Pictures, who released it in the United States on May 15, 1981.

The film received a considerable amount of media attention due to being released a few months after the murder of John Lennon, who was shot to death by Mark David Chapman, a former fan, outside his apartment building The Dakota, a building where Bacall had been living for many years. However, it was a critical and commercial failure.

In an interview with People magazine at the time of the film's release, Bacall expressed disappointment over the film's violent content, saying:

The film received an X rating in the United Kingdom from the British Board of Film Classification.

Box office
Released on May 15, 1981, The Fan grossed $3,082,096 in the United States box office. Based on its budget of approximately $9–10.5 million, the film was a box-office bomb. Rolling Stone included it in a December 1981 list of "Twenty-Four Films that Bombed in 1981."

Critical response
The film received mixed to negative reviews from critics. On Rotten Tomatoes, the film has a 33% rating based on 18 reviews.

Vincent Canby of The New York Times wrote, "With the help of some funny lines in the screenplay by Priscilla Chapman and John Hartwell, Miss Bacall transforms an essentially creaky, lady-in-distress thriller into something approaching a cinematic event ... 'The Fan' is a far from perfect movie, but it's an entertaining one." Variety stated, "While unavoidably predictable, The Fan is a pretty fair thriller, certainly better by far than most of the junk in the marketplace." Gene Siskel gave the film zero stars out of four and called it "nothing more than a cruel shock show" that "reveals nothing about human nature other than the money-grubbing nature of all those who have and will profit from its creation." Sheila Benson of the Los Angeles Times declared the film "a triumph of visual style over thin emotional content" and "a terror-filled but hollow effort." Gilbert Adair of The Monthly Film Bulletin dismissed it as a "mindless thriller."

Ron Cowan of the Statesman Journal praised Bacall's performance and deemed the film a "stylish and strongly atmospheric production", though he criticized it for being an ultimately "sludgy mixture of slow-moving events and shallowly conceived characters." Jacqi Tully of the Arizona Daily Star felt the film was exploitative and "lack[ed] substance", noting: "It seems Bianchi opted for the gruesome side of this tale. He spends far too much time showing us grisly knife attacks rather than explaining why these people act as they do. Psychosis and idolatry demand more than a superficial treatment."

Film scholar John Kenneth Muir declared The Fan a "hit or miss affair" in his 2010 book Horror Films of the 1980s, but praised Biehn's performance as "sinister and highly nuanced...  stirring, naturalistic, and thoroughly nuanced."

Accolades
The film was nominated for a Golden Raspberry Award for Worst Original Song for "Hearts, Not Diamonds." The song lost to "Baby Talk" from the film Paternity.

Home media
The Fan was released on DVD in Region 1 by Paramount Pictures on September 24, 2002. On November 11, 2014, the film was released as an "on-demand" DVD-R through the online Warner Bros. Archive Collection. Scream Factory released the film on Blu-ray on November 19, 2019.

Legacy
Though actress Lauren Bacall was publicly critical of the film upon its original release, she stated in 2004 that she felt her performance in it was "among her very best" work. James Garner reflected in his 2011 memoir that The Fan was one of the worst pictures he ever made, and that "the only saving grace was working with Betty Bacall." 

Filmmaker David DeCoteau is a longtime admirer of the film, and contributed to an audio commentary on the film's 2019 Blu-ray release.

Notes

References

Sources

External links
 
 
 
 

1981 films
1981 horror films
1981 LGBT-related films
1980s crime thriller films
American crime thriller films
American horror thriller films
American LGBT-related films
Films about actors
Films about fandom
Films about stalking
Films based on American novels
Films directed by Ed Bianchi
Films produced by Robert Stigwood
Films scored by Pino Donaggio
Films set in New York City
Films shot in New York City
LGBT-related horror films
Paramount Pictures films
1981 directorial debut films
1980s English-language films
1980s American films